Kök-Oy (before 2001: Ивано-Алексеевка Ivano-Alekseyevka) is a village in Talas Region of Kyrgyzstan. It is part of the Talas District. Its population was 6,904 in 2021.

Population

References

Populated places in Talas Region